Hopewell is an abandoned community in Mahaska County, Iowa, United States. The community was located in Monroe Township along the west bank of the North Skunk River. Hopewell had a post office from 1851 to 1877.

References

Geography of Mahaska County, Iowa
Ghost towns in Iowa